The Golden West is an Australian film directed by George Young set in the Australian goldfields. It is considered a lost film.

Production
This was the first movie from the Australian Film Syndicate, which was formed in early 1911 with the financial backing of a draper, doctor and squatter from Goulburn. Their low-budget films were directed by George Young and their technical department was run by Jack Wainwright and Lacey Percival. The company ran out of a small studio and laboratory in North Sydney but did not last long due to poor financial returns for their movies.

References

External links
 

Australian black-and-white films
1911 films
Australian silent short films
Lost Australian films